The Silverball Museum is a museum of pinball machines, located at 19 NE 3rd Avenue, Delray Beach, Florida. It contains a changing variety of restored and newer machines. Admission to the museum gives free play on the machines.

There is a second Silverball Museum in Asbury Park, New Jersey.

External links
 Silverball Museum Web site

Museums in Palm Beach County, Florida
Delray Beach, Florida
Pinball machines